Elmwood Aviation is a Canadian aircraft manufacturer, founded by aircraft designer Ron Mason and based in Frankford, Ontario (formerly in Belleville, Ontario). The company specializes in the design of light aircraft for amateur construction, especially for missionary aviation use. The Christavia aircraft series name means "Christ-in-Aviation".

Plans are marketed by Aircraft Spruce & Specialty Co as well as directly by Elmwood Aviation.

All of Mason's designs use his own custom airfoil profile. The Christavia Mk I first flew in 1983 and over 350 had been completed and flown by 2002.

Aircraft

References

External links

Aircraft manufacturers of Canada
Homebuilt aircraft